The least rasbora or exclamation point rasbora (Boraras urophthalmoides) is a species of ray-finned fish in the genus Boraras. This species is very small, ranging from 12 to 16 mm.

References 

Boraras
Fish described in 1991
Taxa named by Maurice Kottelat